Yardbirds Home Center is a defunct chain of home improvement stores founded by John Morrison Headley in 1975 and based in Santa Rosa, California, United States. Their trademark colors were yellow and white. Their mascot was a white buzzard with yellow overalls.  These stores were not affiliated with the Yard Birds stores based out of Chehalis, Washington that used a black bird with a yellow beak as its mascot.

Yardbirds had stores throughout the Bay Area in Santa Rosa, Petaluma, Fairfield, Concord, Martinez, San Rafael, Vacaville, San Pablo, Vallejo, Alamo and Rohnert Park.

The chain was purchased by Home Depot in 2005 and the stores were closed for remodeling. Two reopened as Home Depots, while three were closed permanently. Five smaller stores were reopened in Spring 2007 as YardBIRDS, a Home Depot company, but have since closed.

Late in January 2009 Home Depot announced the closing of all 5 YardBirds Stores along with the entire EXPO division.

John Morrison Headley, founder of Yardbirds, died in 2012.

References

The Home Depot
Defunct companies based in the San Francisco Bay Area
Hardware stores of the United States
Companies based in Sonoma County, California
American companies established in 1975
Retail companies established in 1975
Retail companies disestablished in 2009
2005 mergers and acquisitions
Petaluma, California
Retail companies based in California
1975 establishments in California
2009 disestablishments in California